Meadow Brook is an unincorporated community in Linden Grove Township, Saint Louis County, Minnesota, United States.

The community is located 12 miles west of Cook at the intersection of State Highway 1 (MN 1) and Saint Louis County Road 139 (Range Line Road).

References

Unincorporated communities in Minnesota
Unincorporated communities in St. Louis County, Minnesota